Yuriy Ivanovych Senytskyi (born 15 May 1997) is a Ukrainian professional footballer who plays as a defensive midfielder for Ukrainian club Kramatorsk.

References

External links
 

1997 births
Living people
People from Vuhlehirsk
Ukrainian footballers
Association football midfielders
FC Shakhtar Donetsk players
FC Illichivets-2 Mariupol players
FC Kramatorsk players
Ukrainian First League players
Ukrainian Second League players